STS-47 was the 50th NASA Space Shuttle mission of the program, as well as the second mission of the Space Shuttle Endeavour. The mission mainly involved conducting experiments in life and material sciences inside Spacelab-J, a collaborative laboratory inside the shuttle's payload bay sponsored by NASA and the National Space Development Agency of Japan (NASDA). This mission carried Mamoru Mohri, the first Japanese astronaut aboard the shuttle, Mae Jemison, the first African-American woman to go to space, and the only married couple to fly together on the shuttle, Mark C. Lee and Jan Davis, contrary to NASA policy.

Crew

Backup crew

Crew seating arrangements 

 
As female and male astronauts became more prominently integrated with the shuttle program, NASA enacted an unwritten rule that husband/wife couples would not be assigned to the same mission. However, when Lee and Davis's marriage became known to NASA officials in January 1991, the officials decided to keep the assignment as is, given that both crewmembers already had important roles within the upcoming mission. When asked at a NASA press conference if intimate activities would be taking place on the mission, Davis denied that possibility.

Mission highlights 

At the beginning of September, a problem with an oxygen line in the shuttle's main propulsion system was identified, however, it was resolved without forcing a postponement of the mission.

STS-47 launched from Pad 39B at 10:23:00 a.m. EDT on September 12, 1992, and was the first on-time mission without launch delays since STS-61-B in 1985.

The mission's primary payload was Spacelab-J — a joint mission between NASA and the National Space Development Agency of Japan (NASDA) — which used a crewed Spacelab module to conduct microgravity research in materials and life sciences. Like many previous missions, the international crew was divided into red and blue teams which would work in two 12-hour shifts for around-the-clock operations. Brown, Lee, and Mohri, were assigned to the red team, and would conduct experiments while Apt, Davis, and Jemison, assigned to the blue team, would rest, and vice versa. As the mission commander, Gibson was free to work with both teams. Spacelab-J included 24 experiments in materials science and 20 life sciences experiments, the majority of which were sponsored by NASDA and NASA, while 2 were sponsored by collaborative civilian efforts. The Payload Crew Training Manager was Homer Hickam, who also worked during the mission as a Crew Interface Coordinator to talk to the crew during their science experiments and relay any concerns from the scientists on the ground.

Materials science investigations covered such fields as biotechnology, electronic materials, fluid dynamics and transport phenomena, glass and ceramics, metals and alloys, and acceleration measurements. Life sciences included experiments on human health, cell separation and biology, developmental biology, animal and human physiology and behavior, space radiation, and biological rhythms. Test subjects included the crew, Japanese koi fish (carp), cultured animal and plant cells, chicken embryos, fruit flies, fungi, plant seeds, frogs and frog eggs, and oriental hornets.

Secondary Experiments 

On the middeck, a variety of experiments were conducted, including the Israel Space Agency Investigation About Hornets (ISAIAH), the Solid Surface Combustion Experiment (SSCE), and the Shuttle Amateur Radio Experiment (SAREX II). External experiments using the Ultraviolet Plume Imager (UVPI) on the LACE satellite and observations at the 
Air Force Maui Optical Station (AMOS) were also conducted while Endeavour was in orbit.

ISAIAH was the first microgravity experiment flown for the Israel Space Agency (ISA). Originating from Tel-Aviv University, it was intended to observe the effects of microgravity on oriental hornets and their ability to build combs in zero-g. However, a failure in the water system resulted in an unexpected rise of the humidity level in the experiment, which resulted in the deaths of 202 out of the 230 hornets and 103 pupae out of the 120 in the experiment. While some of the hornets in the bottom container of the experiment remained active through flight day 7, no new nests were created until after the mission's completion, and the average lifespan of the hornets that flew into space was considerably less than that of the control group. None of the hornet pupae that flew into space metamorphized.

Twelve Get Away Special (GAS) canisters (10 with experiments, 2 with ballast) were carried in the payload bay. Among the GAS canisters was G-102, sponsored by the Boy Scouts of America's Exploring Division in cooperation with the TRW Systems Integration Group, Fairfax, Virginia. The project was named Project POSTAR and was the first space experiment created entirely by members of the Boy Scouts of America.

Also on board were two experiments prepared by Ashford School of Art & Design in Kent, United Kingdom, which, at the time, was a girls-only school. The school had won a competition run by Independent Television News. The experiments were contained in G-520. The first one injected a few grams of cobalt nitrate crystals to a sodium silicate to create a chemical garden in weightless condition. The growths, which were photographed 66 times as they developed, spread out in random directions, twisted, and, in some cases, formed spirals. A second experiment to investigate how Liesegang rings formed in space failed to operate correctly due to friction in parts of the mechanism. On its return, the experiment was exhibited in the London Science Museum.

While in orbit, Jemison planned to speak from orbit on a live TV conference to Chicago grade-school students at an event hosted by NASA and the Chicago Museum of Science and Industry. The event was planned for September 16, 1992, at 7:00 p.m. central time.

The mission, scheduled to end on September 19, 1992, was extended for one more day to complete certain experiments.

Gallery

See also 

 List of human spaceflights
 List of Space Shuttle missions
 Nikon NASA F4
 Spacelab
 Outline of space science
 Project POSTAR
 Space Shuttle

References

External links 
 NASA mission summary 
 STS-47 Post-flight Crew Narration
 Project POSTAR
 STS-47 Launch Flight and Landing Recap

Space Shuttle missions
Spacecraft launched in 1992